This is a list of films produced and distributed by the U.S. film studio Walt Disney Studios, one of the Walt Disney Company's divisions and one of the "Big Five" major film studios. The list includes films produced or released by all existing and defunct labels or subsidiaries of the Walt Disney Studios; including Walt Disney Pictures, Walt Disney Animation Studios, Pixar Animation Studios, Marvel Studios, Lucasfilm, 20th Century Studios, Searchlight Pictures, Disneynature, Touchstone Pictures, and Hollywood Pictures. The list does not include films produced by studios that are now owned by Disney (as part of acquisitions), but were historically not distributed by Disney during their original, initial time of release.

All films listed are theatrical releases by Buena Vista Film Distribution Company, Inc. unless specified.

1930s

1940s

1950s

See also
 List of Disney feature-length home entertainment releases
 List of Disney television films
 List of Disney+ original films
 List of Hollywood Pictures films
 List of films released by Lucasfilm
 List of Marvel Studios films
 List of Searchlight Pictures films
 List of 20th Century Studios films
 List of Touchstone Pictures films
 List of Walt Disney Pictures films
 :Category:Lists of films by studio

References

Further reading
 List of all films released by Disney regardless of label—Disney D23

External links
 The Walt Disney Studios

1930s in American cinema
1940s in American cinema
1950s in American cinema
Films 1937
Lists of films released by Disney
American films by studio